Francis Xavier Mancuso (October 30, 1887 – July 8, 1970) was a leader of Tammany Hall and a  judge for New York's Court of General Sessions.

Biography
He died on July 8, 1970 in Daytona Beach, Florida.

References

Leaders of Tammany Hall
1887 births
1970 deaths